The League of Resident Theatres (LORT) is the largest professional theater association of its kind in the United States, with 75 member theaters located in every major market in the U.S., including 29 states and the District of Columbia. LORT members collectively issue more Equity contracts to actors than Broadway and commercial tours combined.

LORT is also a forum for sharing information regarding all aspects. According to the organization's website, their semi-annual meetings provide opportunities for members to study, discuss, and exchange information on such non-labor management issues as development, marketing, public relations, education, and technology, as well as provide a forum for developing professional relationships. LORT is also committed to the continued training of current and future LORT managers.

LORT serves as a way for member resident theaters, also called regional theaters, to bargain collectively with Actors' Equity Association, the Stage Directors and Choreographers Society, and United Scenic Artists, as well as other major labor unions in the entertainment industry.

Objectives
To promote the general welfare of resident theaters in the U.S. and its territories;
To promote community interest in and support of resident theaters;
To encourage and promote sound communications and relations between resident theaters in the U.S. and between resident theaters and the theater-going public;
To afford resident theaters an opportunity to act for their common purpose and interest;

To act in the interest and on behalf of its members in labor relations and related matters;
To serve as bargaining agent for its members in bargaining collectively with unions representing employees of its members;
To establish and maintain stable and equitable labor relations between its members and unions representing employees of its members;
To provide guidance and assistance to its members in administering collective bargaining agreements;
If requested by a member, to handle disputes between members and their employees and/or union representatives; and
To represent members before government agencies on problems of labor relations.
To carry on all lawful activities which may directly or indirectly contribute to the accomplishment of such purposes; and
To communicate with the Federal Government through the National Endowment for the Arts and the American Arts Alliance and to keep those agencies apprised of the needs and status of LORT's membership.

History
The League of Resident Theatres was formally established on 18 March 1966 by Peter Zeisler, managing director of the Minnesota Theatre Company (a.k.a. the Guthrie Theater), Thomas Fichandler, general manager of Arena Stage, and Morris Kaplan, an attorney. Peter Zeisler was appointed the first president, with Thomas Finchandler as vice president and William Bushnell, manager of Baltimore's Center Stage, as secretary. There were 26 member theaters at the organization's founding. Until then resident theater troupes negotiated individual contracts with Equity; most of them used modifications of commercial theater contracts. In some instances the theaters operated under the terms of Equity's new stock contract, however, resident theater managers have long felt burdened by what they call Equity's "one production" type of contract used on Broadway.

Categories
Theaters are categorized into tiers A through D. Tiers B+ through D are determined by the weekly actual box office receipts averaged over the last three complete fiscal years. No theaters can move in or out of Tier "A" 

Categories and box office receipts are as follows:
"B+”  $110,000.00 and above
"B"	$70,000.00 to $109,999.99
"C"	$45,000.00 to $69,999.99
"D"	$44,999.99 and below

For some purposes, the "C" category is split into "C-1" and "C-2" based on seating capacity.

Member theatres
There are 75 member theatres listed on the 2018 LORT website:

References

External links
 

 
 
Theatre in the United States
Lists of theatres in the United States